The  was an armoured car used by the Empire of Japan both before and during World War II.

Design and history
The Type 93 was specifically designed to be operated on rail or roads. For that purpose, it was equipped with two kinds of wheels: flanged steel wheels for railroad use, and solid rubber tires for roads. The vehicle had three axles; to provide better balance and pitch control, a pair of auxiliary metal wheels were mounted behind the front axle. It could be switched from the steel rail wheels to the road wheels in ten minutes time. Armament consisted of one 7.7 mm machine gun and four 6.5 mm Type 91 machine guns or four Nambu Type 11 machine guns. Its anti-aircraft machine-gun mount could be stowed inside the top turret. It is also known as the Type 2593 "Hokoku" or Type 93 "Kokusan" armored car. It has also been incorrectly referred to as a Type 92, when the "right designation is Type 93".

The Type 93 was originally made for use by the Japanese Navy marine units of the Special Naval Landing Forces. They were used extensively in China. The armored cars being used in the coastal regions of China near ports and Japanese bases. The vehicle was considered a superior design to the Chiyoda armored car. The "gable-roof bonnet" was designed to deflect grenades and the front sloping plate of its turret allowed it to fire at the high angle needed to reach the top floors of buildings on the narrow Chinese streets.

Notes

References

External links
Taki's Imperial Japanese Army Page - Akira Takizawa
wwiivehicles: Japan's Sumida Type 2593 (Type 93) armored cars

Isuzu
Armoured cars of the interwar period
Armoured cars of Japan
Military vehicles introduced in the 1930s
Armoured cars of Manchukuo
Military draisines